This is a list of articles listing players who have been capped for either the men's England national football team or the women's England women's national football team.

Men 
 England national football team records
 List of England international footballers with 10 caps or more
 List of England international footballers (4–9 caps)
 List of England international footballers (2–3 caps)
 List of England international footballers born outside England
 List of England international footballers capped while playing for a lower division club
 List of England international footballers with one cap 
 List of England national football team captains
 List of England national football team hat-tricks
 List of England national football team World Cup and European Championship squads

Women 
 List of England women's international footballers (alphabetical)

 
Association football player non-biographical articles